The Dinosaur and the Missing Link: A Prehistoric Tragedy is a 1915 American comedy silent film animated with stop motion by Willis O'Brien. The film was distributed by Thomas Edison's film company Conquest Pictures in 1917.

The film is also known as The Dinosaur and the Baboon (American reissue title).

Plot
It starts with a caveman going to give some flowers to a cavegirl. He fails when he hits a tree. However, he keeps going. However, the "Self Appointed Hero" of the story steals the girl's heart. Meanwhile, an evil gorilla-like ape called "Wild Willie" the Missing Link is watching them. When the Missing Link goes to hunt for snakes at the lake, where the dinosaur is, the dinosaur kills the Missing Link after a fight and goes away. Then the "Hero" finds the Missing Link and takes the credit for killing Wild Willie.

Reception
Smithsonian Magazine called the film "a strange bit of cinema. Cavemen, the ape-like "missing link" and an ornery sauropod dinosaur act as the players in this early precursor to films like 1981's Caveman. Crude though they were, these stop-motion creatures created by O'Brien would help launch his film career. Better known as the special effects wizard behind The Lost World and King Kong, O'Brien was among the first filmmakers to resurrect dinosaurs on film, leaving an impressive legacy still carried on by special effects experts today."

References

External links

The Dinosaur and the Missing Link  at the Library of Congress website

1917 films
American animated short films
Silent American comedy films
American silent short films
1910s American animated films
1910s animated short films
1917 comedy films
American black-and-white films
Animated films about dinosaurs
Animated films set in prehistory
Films about cavemen
Articles containing video clips
1917 short films
1917 animated films
Films using stop-motion animation